, was bureaucrat and politician in the Empire of Japan, serving as a member of the Upper House of the Diet of Japan, Chief Cabinet Secretary, governor of Fukuoka Prefecture and twice as a cabinet minister.

Biography 
Yoshida was born in what is now part of the city of Usuki, Ōita, where his father worked as an official of the Bank of Japan. He graduated from the Law Department of Tokyo Imperial University in 1911, and also passed the highest level of the civil service examinations. In late 1911, he entered the Home Ministry, serving as Deputy Mayor of Tokyo in 1923.  Following the Great Kantō earthquake, he was assigned to the Reconstruction Bureau within the Home Ministry, and later to the bureau in charge of regulating Shinto shrines under State Shintoism.
From October 1934 to May 1935, Yoshida served as Chief Cabinet Secretary under the Okada administration and was also appointed to a seat on the Planning Board. In 1937, he was appointed to the Upper House of the Diet of Japan. He was asked to become Minister of Welfare under the Yonai administration from January to July 1940, and was appointed governor of Fukuoka Prefecture in July 1943 by Prime Minister Hideki Tōjō. Under Tōjō’s successor, Kuniaki Koiso, Yoshida was recalled to Tokyo to serve as Minister of Munitions from December 1944 to April 1945. As Munitions Minister, he attempted to construct underground armament-manufacturing facilities to protect them from aerial bombing.

Following the end of World War II, Yoshida, along with all other members of the former Japanese government was purged from public office by the Supreme Commander of the Allied Powers, but was not arrested. In 1953, a year after the end of the Occupation of Japan, he became head of the Association of Shinto Shrines.

Another Yoshida
The bureaucrat Shigeru Yoshida was often confused with another politician of similar age with exactly the same name. Shigeru Yoshida served as post-war Foreign Minister and Prime Minister of Japan. The bureaucrat Shigeru Yoshida was often referred to as "Mejiro Yoshida" from the location of his residence in Mejiro, Tokyo, whereas the other Yoshida was referred to as "Ōiso Yoshida" after the location of his summer villa in Ōiso, Kanagawa.

References

1885 births
1954 deaths
People from Ōita Prefecture
Members of the House of Peers (Japan)
Government ministers of Japan
University of Tokyo alumni